Daniel Robert is an American set decorator. He was nominated for an Academy Award in the category Best Art Direction for the film Interiors.

Selected filmography
 Interiors (1978)

References

External links

Year of birth missing (living people)
Living people
American set decorators